Qareh Gol (also Romanized as Qarah Gol) is a village in Zeri Rural District, Qatur District, Khoy County, West Azerbaijan Province, Iran. At the 2006 census, its population was 153, in 25 families.

References 

Populated places in Khoy County